Larisa Veniaminovna Gorchakova (also spelled Gortchacova; born 9 July 1964) is a Russian backstroke swimmer, who won a bronze medal at the 1982 World Aquatics Championships and three medals at the 1981 European Aquatics Championships. She also competed at the 1980 Summer Olympics and finished sixth in the 100 m and eights in the 200 m backstroke events. Between 1981 and 1984, she won five national titles (USSR).

After retirement, between 1998 and 2000, she set five national (Russia) records and won two national titles in masters divisions.

References

1964 births
Russian female backstroke swimmers
Olympic swimmers of the Soviet Union
Swimmers at the 1980 Summer Olympics
Living people
World Aquatics Championships medalists in swimming
European Aquatics Championships medalists in swimming
Universiade medalists in swimming
Universiade gold medalists for the Soviet Union
Medalists at the 1983 Summer Universiade
Soviet female backstroke swimmers
Sportspeople from Volgograd Oblast